Arvo Ossian Aaltonen (2 December 1892 – 17 June 1949) was a Finnish breaststroke swimmer who competed at the 1912, 1920 and 1924 Summer Olympics. He won bronze medals in the 200 m and 400 m events in 1920, and failed to reach the finals in 1912 and 1924.

Aaltonen was the first, and until 1992, (with Antti Kasvio’s bronze medal-winning 200m freestyle performance) the only Finnish Olympic medalist in swimming. He won the 200 m event at the 1923 Nordic Championships, and he held 22 Finnish titles: in the 100 m (1912, 1915–17), 200 m (1909, 1911–13, 1915–16, 1919–21, 1923, 1925–27) and 400 m (1912–13, 1915–17). In 1924–30 and 1946–47 he was a board member of the Finnish Swimming Federation. He immigrated to Canada in 1929, but returned to Finland in 1937.

References

1892 births
1949 deaths
Sportspeople from Pori
Finnish male breaststroke swimmers
Olympic swimmers of Finland
Swimmers at the 1912 Summer Olympics
Swimmers at the 1920 Summer Olympics
Swimmers at the 1924 Summer Olympics
Olympic bronze medalists for Finland
Olympic bronze medalists in swimming
Male breaststroke swimmers
Medalists at the 1920 Summer Olympics
19th-century Finnish people
20th-century Finnish people